The Users were an English punk rock band, formed in Cambridge, England, that was active between 1977 and 1979.

History
In 1977, Cambridge record dealer Lee Wood founded Raw Records, and quickly recorded The Users in March of the year, releasing the single "Sick of You" / "(I'm) In Love With Today" on May 5, 1977.  Sounds magazine stated that it "burns into your brain without compromise."

Despite only releasing two singles and being active for less than three years, the band developed a lasting cult following. BBC Radio 1 DJ John Peel placed their first single "Sick of You" in his chosen Festive Fifty chart of 1977, and after his death it was revealed that he'd kept it as part of his favourite singles of all time.  The single was later reissued in 1999 and 2006 by Damaged Goods.

Guitarist Chris Free, would find some success as the writer of Tracie Young's 1983 hit single, "Give It Some Emotion".
& now writes and plays for The Sound Of Pop Art 

The drummer's son Sean Patrick O’Hanrahan is now the keyboard player in Max Bianco & The Blue Hearts.

Bass player Rick Tucker went on to be a lead for mental health nursing in secure environments before returning to music and becoming becoming a novelist. His album Paint the Blue Grass Green is available online and his novels A Dog Unchained, and Under the Flamboyant Tree, both set in Trinidad and Tobago have gained him a wider audience.

In October 2008, a discography compilation, Secondary Modern: 1976-1979, was released on Bin Liner records (part of Detour Records).

In 2007, Spin magazine named "Sick of You" one of the 20 best singles of 1977 by bands who not yet released an album.  Jello Biafra of Dead Kennedys has cited the single as one of his favorite singles in terms of production when his band recorded 1980's Fresh Fruit for Rotting Vegetables.

Discography

Singles
"Sick of You" / "(I'm) in Love With Today" 7" (1977, Raw Records) (Reissued 2006, Damaged Goods)
"Kicks in Style" / "Dead On Arrival" 7" (1978, Warped Records) (Reissued 2010, 1977 Records)
"Now That It's Over" / "Listen" 7" (2018, Love Child Records)

Albums and EPs
Secondary Modern 1976-1979 CD, (2008, Bin Liner Records)
Kicks In Style (2012, Rave Up Records) 12" vinyl
Lo-Fi EP, (2012, Rave Up Records) 7" vinyl

References

External links
 The Users - Official Album Website at Detour Records
 Punk history website

English punk rock groups
Musical groups established in 1976